Odites approximans is a moth in the family Depressariidae. It was described by Aristide Caradja in 1927. It is found in the Russian Far East, Korea and China.

The wingspan is 19–23 mm.

References

Moths described in 1927
Odites